1808 in sports describes the year's events in world sport.

Boxing
Events
 10 May — John Gully successfully defends his English title by defeating Bob Gregson in 24 rounds at Woburn.  Gully announces his retirement later in the year.
 8 October — Tom Cribb defeats Bob Gregson in 23 rounds at Moulsey Hurst to win the English championship following John Gully's retirement.

Cricket
Events
 George Osbaldeston makes his debut in first-class cricket.
England
 Most runs – Lord Frederick Beauclerk 379 (HS 100)
 Most wickets – Thomas Howard and Lord Frederick Beauclerk 16 apiece

Horse racing
England
 The Derby – Pan
 The Oaks – Morel
 St Leger Stakes – Petronius

References

 
1808